Catania Centrale is the main railway station of the Italian city of Catania, in Sicily. Along with Palermo Centrale, Messina Centrale and Syracuse it is one of the most important stations of its region. It is managed by the Ferrovie dello Stato, the national rail company of Italy.

History
The station was inaugurated on 24 June 1866. One century later it was upgraded and renewed due to the electrification of the Messina-Catania line.

Structure and transport
Catania Centrale is located close to the Port of Catania and by the sea. It has a railway depot and a link to the port. The station building has two floors and a portico and is protected by the national cultural heritage.

The station is electrified and served by regional trains and by the Circumetnea railway. For long-distance transport there are InterCity and Express trains to Rome, Turin, Milan and Venice, linking it also with Genoa, Naples, Bologna, Florence, Pisa and other cities.

Gallery

See also
List of railway stations in Sicily
Railway stations in Italy
Rail transport in Italy
History of rail transport in Italy

Notes and references

External links

Centrale
Railway stations opened in 1867